Yisroel Zev Gustman (1908 - June 10, 1991) was a rabbi, and the last Dayan (rabbinic judge) in Vilna during World War II.

After the war he moved to the United States, headed a Yeshiva on Eastern Parkway, in Brooklyn, NY, and in 1971 immigrated to Israel, where he established the Netzach Yisroel - Vilna Ramiles Yeshiva in the Rechavia neighborhood of Jerusalem.

On Thursday afternoons he gave an open, high-level shiur in the yeshiva, attended by "Rabbis, intellectuals, religious court judges, a Supreme Court justice and various professors."

Biography
Yisroel Zev Gustman was born in Lithuania (then in the Pale of Settlement of the Russian Empire) in 1908. In his youth he was known as an illui and learned in Chavrusa together with Chaim Shmuelevitz in Grodno, and learned from Shimon Shkop at the Grodno Yeshiva.

At age 20 he married a daughter of Rabbi Meir Bassin, who died shortly before the wedding; despite his age, Gustman inherited Bassin's positions of both dayan in the Bais Din of Rabbi Chaim Ozer Grodzinski and Rosh Yeshiva of the Ramailes Yeshiva in Vilna.

Gustman's son Meir was murdered by the Nazis. Gustman, his wife Sarah and a daughter survived.

Life in Israel
The yeshiva he opened in Israel was named after the yeshiva in Vilna he had headed, beginning in 1935 until World War II. Instrestingly, as a form of payback that his life was saved by "the shelter of the bushes and the fruit of the trees" in a forest during the war, he personally acted as gardener in a yeshiva in Israel.

The Gustmans were alive to see grandchildren. Gustman's wife passed away before he did.

Written Works
Gustman's main writings, some published posthumously by his son-in-law, were volumes on the following Talmudic tractates:
 Gittin
 Kiddushin
 Bava Kama
 Bava Metzia 
 Bava Batra
 Nedarim
 Ketubot
Kuntresei Shiurim

References

External links
 Artscroll book Rav Gustman
 OU web site story about Rav Gustman
 Photo on Hebrew Wikipedia of Rav Gustman
Jewish History Soundbites: From Vilna to Rechavia: The Life of Rav Yisroel Zev Gustman

1908 births
1991 deaths
Rabbis from Vilnius
Orthodox rabbis from New York City
Rabbis in Jerusalem
20th-century American rabbis